The Biblical Fundamentalist Presbyterian Church in Chile was founded in 1960, as a result of a fundamentalist fraction split from the National Presbyterian Church in Chile.
The church adheres to the Apostles Creed and Westminster Confession.
The denomination has 41 congregations and a Presbyterian church government.

References

External links

Presbyterian denominations in South America
Christian organizations established in 1960
1960 establishments in Chile
Presbyterianism in Chile
Presbyterian denominations established in the 20th century
Fundamentalist denominations